Koike Dam  is an earthfill dam located in Hyogo Prefecture in Japan. The dam is used for flood control and irrigation. The catchment area of the dam is 0.3 km2. The dam can store 64 thousand cubic meters of water. The construction of the dam was started on 1988 and completed in 1990.

See also
List of dams in Japan

References

Dams in Hyogo Prefecture